Amable Courtecuisse (29 December 1823 – 7 September 1873), whose stage name was Désiré, was a French baritone, who is particularly remembered for creating many comic roles in the works of the French operetta composer Jacques Offenbach.

Life and career
He was born in Lille or a nearby village of it, and studied the bassoon, singing, and declamation at the Lille Conservatory. His first appearances were at small theatres in Belgium and northern France beginning in 1845.

In 1847, he arrived at the Théâtre Montmartre in Paris where he met Hervé. He asked Hervé to provide him with a musical sketch (drawn from Cervantes' novel Don Quixote), in which the tall and thin Hervé as the Don was pitted against the short and plump Désiré as Sancho Pança. The sketch inspired what was later dubbed the first French operetta, Hervé's Don Quichotte et Sancho Pança, which premiered in 1848 at Adolphe Adam's Théâtre National at the Cirque Olympique, but with  Joseph Kelm, instead of Désiré, as Sancho Pança.

In subsequent years Désiré appeared in operetta theatres in Lille, Brussels, and Marseille. He also became a star at Hervé’s Parisian Folies-Concertantes (later the Folies-Nouvelles).

Finally he was engaged by Jacques Offenbach for the Théâtre des Bouffes-Parisiens, where Désiré made his brilliantly successful debut on 16 May 1857 in Vent-du-Soir, ou l'horrible festin. Thereafter until 1873 he remained one of the star actors of Offenbach's company, appearing in many of the premieres of Offenbach's most famous operettas. His greatest success was his unforgettable portrayal of the role of Jupiter in Orpheus in the Underworld, which premiered on 21 October 1858.

Désiré also appeared at other Parisian theatres, including the Théâtre des Variétés, the Théâtre du Palais-Royal, and the Athénée-Musicale, and also worked with the French operetta composer Charles Lecocq.

At the end of his career Désiré became increasingly addicted to alcohol and died, abandoned and in poverty, in Asnières-sur-Seine. He died on the 7th September 1873, aged 49, in his house in Courbevoie. A large congregation consisting much of theatrical Paris (including Ludovic Halévy, Hector Crémieux, Charles Lecocq, Berthelier, Léonce, Hyacinthe, Baron and Anna Judic), attended his funeral on the 10th of September.

Roles created
Works by Offenbach unless otherwise noted:

1857: Vent-du-Soir in Vent du soir, ou L’horrible festin
1857: Pigeonneau in Une demoiselle en loterie
1858: Mme Madou in Mesdames de la Halle
1858: Dig-dig in La chatte métamorphosée en femme
1858: Jupiter in Orpheus in the Underworld (in French)
1859: Le marquis de Criquebœuf in L'omelette à la Follembuche by Léo Delibes
1859: Golo in Geneviève de Brabant
1860: Pan in Daphnis et Chloé
1860: Grétry in Le musicien de l'avenir
1861: Maître Fortunio in La chanson de Fortunio
1861: Cornarino Cornarini in Le pont des soupirs
1861: Choufleuri in M. Choufleuri restera chez lui le . . .
1862: Adolphe Dunanan in Le voyage de MM Dunanan père & fils
1862: Cristobal in Bavard et bavarde
1863: Fritzchen in Lischen et Fritzchen
1863: Bertolucci in Il signor Fagotto
1864: Jol-Hiddin in Les géorgiennes
1864: Cabochon in Jeanne qui pleure et Jean qui rit
1864: Van Croquesec in Le serpent à plumes by Delibes
1865: Vautendon in Les bergers
1866: undetermined role in Didon by G. Blangini
1868: Tien-Tien in Fleur-de-Thé by Charles Lecocq
1869: undetermined role in L’écossais de Chatou by Léo Delibes
1869: Cabriolo in La princesse de Trébizonde
1869: Rafaël in La diva
1869: undetermined role in Le rajah de Mysore by Lecocq
1869: Cabriolo in La princesse de Trébizonde (revised 3-act version)
1871: Balabrelock in Boule-de-neige
1872: Raab in La timbale d'argent by Léon Vasseur
1873: undetermined role in La petite reine by Vasseur

In 1867 he also appeared at the Théâtre des Nouveautés as Sganarelle in La statue du commandeur.

References

 This article incorporates some material re-edited from French Wikipedia

External links
 Obituary in The Era Almnack, 1874 by Edward Ledger (at Google Books)

1823 births
1873 deaths
French operatic baritones
French male stage actors
Musicians from Lille
19th-century French male actors
19th-century French male opera singers